Stade Marocain is a Moroccan football club currently playing in the second division. The club was founded in 1919 and they play at the Stade Ahmed Chhoude. The club is one of three clubs in the based in the capital of Morocco, Rabat. The two other clubs are FAR Rabat and FUS de Rabat.

Honours

Botola
Winners (3): 1928, 1931, 1945
Runner-up (1): 1964Moroccan Championship before Independence: 3'''
1928, 1931, 1944

References

Football clubs in Morocco
Sport in Rabat
Sports clubs in Morocco
1919 establishments in Morocco